Lahnau is a municipality in the Lahn-Dill-Kreis in Hesse, Germany, and lies about midway – about 6 km each way – between the towns of Wetzlar and Gießen.

Geography

Neighbouring communities
Lahnau borders in the north on the community of Biebertal, in the east on the community of Heuchelheim (both in Gießen district), and in the south and west on the town of Wetzlar (Lahn-Dill-Kreis).

Constituent communities
The centres of Atzbach (3,065 inhabitants), Dorlar (1,924 inhabitants) and Waldgirmes (3,393 inhabitants) are all part of the community.

(The population figures are drawn from a statistical extrapolation from 30 June 2003)

The community of Dorlar had itself incorporated into Wetzlar in 1972. Wetzlar, Gießen, Atzbach, Waldgirmes and 12 other municipalities formed from 1977 to 1979 the city of Lahn. Within Lahn, the constituent communities of Waldgirmes, Dorlar and Atzbach the Stadtbezirk (roughly "borough") of Lahntal. After the city of Lahn was dissolved, the borough became an independent community under the name Lahnau on 1 August 1979

The constituent community of Dorlar thereby managed to belong to four different municipalities over only seven years, which stands as a curiosity even in the complex history of Hessian municipal reform.

Public institutions

Educational institutions
Lahntalschule Lahnau (district integrated comprehensive school in Atzbach)
Grundschule Waldgirmes

Sports and leisure
Trimm-Dich-Pfad Atzbach (path)
Sportpark Lahnau in Dorlar, artificial turf and hard court, athletic facility
Indoor and outdoor swimming pool with 50m × 12.5m basin and broad sunbathing lawn
Riding hall and square
Sports ground in Waldgirmes, natural and artificial turf

Clubs
TSV Atzbach (gymnastic and sport club)
SC 1929 Waldgirmes (sport club)
TV05 Waldgirmes (gymnastic club)
TSG Dorlar (gymnastic and sport club)
AS LahnLaender Lahnau
CVJM Atzbach-Dorlar (YMCA)
CVJM Waldgirmes (YMCA)
Sängervereinigung Waldgirmes (singers' association)
Deutsch-Englischer Freundeskreis Lahnau e.V. (German-English circle of friends)
Burschenschaft Fidelio Atzbach e.V. (fraternity)
Mädchenschaft Atzbach (sorority)

Town partnerships
  Wincanton, United Kingdom
  Geraberg, Thuringia

Culture and sightseeing
 The Roman Forum von Waldgirmes – owing to a lack of any Roman written record of the place it is still nameless – is Germany's oldest known stone building foundation, and shows that the Romans founded a town in Magna Germania north of the Danube and east of the Rhine. The site was dated by finds of Roman coins showing likenesses of Publius Quinctilius Varus, placing the ruins at about the time of the Battle of the Teutoburg Forest in the year 9, in which Varus lost three legions and his own life.

Museums
Heimatmuseum in Waldgirmes (local history)

Buildings

Atzbach Church
Amtsgericht Atzbach (formerly the ''Amt courthouse, now a primary school)
Backhaus Atzbach ("bakehouse")
Dorlar Church
Altes Backhaus Dorlar (https://web.archive.org/web/20161003145317/http://altesbackhauslahnau.de/)
Waldgirmes Church

Regular events
 Kirmes in Atzbach (Atzbach Fair), in May
 2. Advent Atzbacher Adventmarkt
 LahnLaender, last Sunday in June
 Kirmes in Waldgirmes (Waldgirmes Fair), first weekend in August

References

External links
Lahnau
Evangelical parishes of Dorlar & Atzbach

Lahn-Dill-Kreis